The Turkmen People's Cultural and Political Society, also known as the Turkmensahra Councils Central Headquarters, was a Marxist-Leninist and ethnic insurgent group based in Gonbad-e Kavus, Iran.

It was established in the immediate aftermath of the Iranian Revolution and mobilized Iranian Turkmens who mostly follow Sunni Islam. It was closely associated with the Organization of Iranian People's Fedai Guerrillas (OIPFG) in terms of political bent. The two organizations waged an armed rebellion in Turkmen Sahra against the post-revolutionary government in two spells. The first phase began on 26 March 1979 in an attempt to demand for local land reform, but soon a ceasefire was brokered with the Interim Government of Iran. The second phase erupted in February 1980 between the two sides, but it was suppressed by the Islamic Revolutionary Guard Corps. Kidnapping and murdering leaders of the group led to a major blow to the organization that it could not recover from.

References 

Militant opposition to the Islamic Republic of Iran
Ethnic organizations
Political parties of the Iranian Revolution
Left-wing militant groups in Iran
1979 establishments in Iran
Guerrilla organizations
Communist parties in Iran